HolbyBlue is a British police procedural drama which was created by Tony Jordan. The show is set in the fictional city of Holby, and focuses on the daily lives of police officers working at Holby South police station. The show's ensemble cast for series one consisted of Jimmy Akingbola, Joe Jacobs, David Sterne, Cal MacAninch, James Hillier, Kacey Ainsworth, Richard Harrington, Zöe Lucker, Chloe Howman, Kieran O'Brien, Tim Pigott-Smith and Elaine Glover. Pigott-Smith departed the drama in the final episode of the first series at the conclusion of his character's storyline. Actors Oliver Milburn and James Thornton joined the drama for series two.

The creation of HolbyBlue was announced on 27 April 2006 by the BBC. It was revealed that the show would have links to British medical drama Holby City. Tony Jordan was recruited to write scripts for the show and work out "how storylines between the police station and the hospital could be intertwined." The first series began filming at the end of January 2007, commenced airing on 8 May 2007 at 8pm, one week later than scheduled for unknown reasons, and concluded on 26 June 2007. On 21 June 2007, it was announced that HolbyBlue would air a second series in 2008, this time for an extended run of twelve episodes. Filming recommenced in late 2007 in Surrey, and the second series began airing on 20 March 2008, concluding on 5 June 2008. Two series of HolbyBlue aired in total.

On 6 August 2008, the BBC revealed that HolbyBlue would not be recommissioned for a third series, due to a decline in viewership. The second series started with 5.6 million viewers, but by the end of May had fallen to 2.5 million. Upon the cancellation of the show, Red Planet Picture's drama executive Claire Phillips stated that "HolbyBlue set new standards for 8pm dramas, in terms of production values, storytelling and casting." At the 2007 and 2008 Inside Soap Awards, HolbyBlue was nominated under the Best Drama category. Ainsworth and Lucker both received nominations for Best Actress at the TV Quick & TV Choice Awards in 2007, while HolbyBlue was nominated under the Best New Drama Series category. Akingbola was put forward for Best Male Performance in TV at the 2008 Screen Nation Awards.

Series overview

Series 1 (2007)

Series 2 (2008)

References

External links
List of HolbyBlue episodes at BBC Online

BBC-related lists
Holby
HolbyBlue